Events in the year 1801 in India.

Incumbents 
 Shah Alam II and the Nawab of Oudh, Mughal Emperor, reigned 10 December 1759 – 19 November 1806
 James Henry Craig, Commander-in-Chief of India, February 1801 – March 1801
 General Gerard Lake, 1st Viscount Lake,  Commander-in-Chief of India, March 1801 – July 1805

Events
 National income - 11,209 million
Annexation of Allahabad by the British.
Shezada Hyder Ali,  grandson of Hyder Ali, joined the Maratha
Maharaja Ranjit Singh created an imperial power

Law

References

 
India
Years of the 19th century in India